The Prime Minister of the Federation of Rhodesia and Nyasaland (also known as the Central African Federation) served as the country's head of government. The federation was formed on 1 August 1953 from the former colonies of Southern Rhodesia, Northern Rhodesia and Nyasaland, and was formally dissolved on 31 December 1963.

List of prime ministers of the Federation of Rhodesia and Nyasaland
Parties

See also
Governor-General of the Federation of Rhodesia and Nyasaland

Notes

Timeline

Sources

External links
World Statesmen – Federation of Rhodesia and Nyasaland

.
History of the Federation of Rhodesia and Nyasaland
Rhodesia and Nyasaland
Lists of political office-holders in Zambia
Lists of political office-holders in Zimbabwe
Malawi history-related lists
20th-century Zambian people
20th-century Zimbabwean people